When You're Gone may refer to:

 "When You're Gone" (Avril Lavigne song), 2007
 "When You're Gone" (Bryan Adams song), 1998
 "When You're Gone" (The Cranberries song), 1996
 When You're Gone (Shawn Mendes song), 2022
 "When You're Gone", a US bonus song on Richard Marx's 2004 album My Own Best Enemy
 "When You Are Gone", a 1968 song by Jim Reeves

See also 
 You're Gone (disambiguation)